Chryseïs (minor planet designation: 202 Chryseïs) is a large, lightly coloured Main belt asteroid that is probably composed of silicate rocks. It was discovered by C. H. F. Peters on September 11, 1879, in Clinton, New York, and was named after the mythical Trojan woman Chryseis.

The rotation period for this asteroid is close to a day long, so the construction of a complete light curve requires photometric observations from multiple locations at widely spaced latitudes. This task was completed in January and February, 2011, yielding a synodic rotation period of 23.670 ± 0.001 h, with a brightness variation of 0.20 ± 0.02 in magnitude

References

External links 
 The Asteroid Orbital Elements Database
 Asteroid Lightcurve Parameters
 Asteroid Albedo Compilation
 
 

000202
Discoveries by Christian Peters
Named minor planets
000202
18790911